Barwon was an electoral district of the Legislative Assembly in the Australian state of Victoria from 1877 to 1955.

Members

Election results

References

Former electoral districts of Victoria (Australia)
1877 establishments in Australia
1955 disestablishments in Australia